William Garton Bowdler (March 27, 1924 – January 19, 2016) was an American diplomat.

Biography

William G. Bowdler was born in Buenos Aires, Argentina on March 27, 1924.  He later immigrated to Florida, and served in the U.S. Army from 1944 to 1946.  He became a U.S. citizen in 1945.  He was educated at the University of Richmond, receiving a B.A. in history in 1948.  He then attended The Fletcher School of Law and Diplomacy, receiving an M.A. in 1949.

In 1950, Bowdler joined the United States Department of State as a research assistant.  In 1951, he became an international administration officer, and from 1952 to 1956, he was an international relations officer in the Bureau of Inter-American Affairs.  He spent 1956 through 1961 as a political and consular officer in Havana.

Bowdler then served as an international relations officer from 1961 to 1963.  He spent 1963-64 as the State Department's Deputy Coordinator of Cuban Affairs, and then served as executive liaison officer for Latin American affairs with the White House from 1964 through 1968.

In 1968, President of the United States Lyndon B. Johnson chose Bowdler as United States Ambassador to El Salvador, and Bowdler held this post from November 15, 1968, until September 2, 1971.  In 1971, President Richard Nixon appointed him United States Ambassador to Guatemala, and he filled this post from October 19, 1971, through August 26, 1973.  
 
Bowdler returned to the United States in 1973, becoming Deputy Assistant Secretary of State for Inter-American Affairs; he served as Acting Assistant Secretary of State for Inter-American Affairs in 1974.

President Gerald Ford appointed Bowdler as United States Ambassador to South Africa in 1975, with Bowdler filling this post from May 14, 1975, until April 19, 1978.

In 1978, President Jimmy Carter nominated Bowdler as Director of the Bureau of Intelligence and Research and Bowdler held this office from April 24, 1978, to December 17, 1979. Carter then named Bowdler Assistant Secretary of State for Inter-American Affairs, and Bowdler held that office from January 4, 1980, until January 16, 1981.

References
President Carter's Nomination of Bowdler as Assistant Secretary of State for Inter-American Affairs
William Bowdler

1924 births
United States Assistant Secretaries of State
The Stony Brook School alumni
University of Richmond alumni
Ambassadors of the United States to El Salvador
Ambassadors of the United States to Guatemala
Ambassadors of the United States to South Africa
People from Buenos Aires
Argentine emigrants to the United States
2016 deaths
American expatriates in Cuba